NESPOS is an open source information platform about Pleistocene humans, providing detailed information about important sites, their analytical results, archaeological findings and a selection of literary quotes. Moreover, it is a repository where archaeologists and paleoanthropologists can exchange their research results and ideas by a protected Wiki-based collaboration platform with a continuously growing sample of 3D scanned human fossils and artefacts.

NESPOS 
NESPOS was developed during the EU-funded project TNT and was designed as an interactive online database containing, in the long run, all available anthropological and archaeological data related to Neanderthals, e.g. computed tomography (CT) and 3D surface scans of Neanderthal fossils and artefacts as well as additional data like scanned literature, images or tables.
TNT was a Specific Targeted Research or Innovation Project of the EU “Digicult” program, which facilitates research and preservation work on Europe's artistic and cultural treasures using modern technology.
Involved in the project were: ART+COM, a company for interactive media technology in Berlin; PXP Software Austria GmbH, an e-Business company in Austria; the Hasso-Plattner Institute in Potsdam, Germany; the Royal Belgian Institute of Natural Sciences in Brussels; the University of Poitiers in France; the Natural History Museum of Croatia; the Neanderthal Museum in Mettmann and National Geographic Germany.
Using Wiki-functionality, the NESPOS users themselves are able to upload data or add their comments to their colleagues’ entries. A metadata search provides an efficient tool for content retrieval. In addition, software for 3D and 2D visualisation of digitised finds as well as geographic information about excavation sites is an integrated part of the system. Since March 2006 NESPOS is open to the scientific community.
In 2008 NESPOS underwent an updating and is now open for all kinds of data on human evolution. Data on Homo erectus, Homo heidelbergensis and Australopithecus africanus have already been uploaded.
Another huge updating process was started in April 2009. NESPOS is now open for any user, only the important 3D-datasets are stored in a spezialed Space, which can only be entered by scientific members of the Society.

VisiCore Suite 

VisiCore Suite - The NESPOS 3D applications are conjoint with the Visual Simulation and Collaborative Rendering Engine. The VisiCore Suite provides archaeological visualisation and annotation tools.

The two main components are:

ArteCore - the Artefact Exploration and Collaboration Rendering Engine provides a toolset of
real-time 2D and 3D visualisation routines for the examination of the remains‘ virtual high
resolution-representations.

GeoCore - the Site Mapping and Rendering Engine provides a mapbased geo information system for
presenting, exploring, and editing of archaeological excavation data in real-time 3D perspective.

External links 
 NESPOS Society e.V.
 Neanderthal Museum
 NESPOS on youtube.com

References 
 Establishing the leading Scientific Network on Neanderthal research - TNT Final Report (May 2006) PDF
 Gröning, F. et al. (2005): TNT – The Neanderthal Tools: Providing an Online Database and Collaboration Platform for Neanderthal Research In: Archäologie und Computer 2005. Workshop 10, pp. 1–10 PDF
 Semal, P. et al. (2004) TNT: The Neanderthal Tools. In, K. Chain et al. (Hg.): The 5th International Symposium on Virtual Reality, Archaeology and Cultural Heritage VAST, pp. 1–2 PDF
 Semal, P. et al. (2005): Numérisation des restes humains néandertaliens belges - Préservation patrimoniale et exploitation scientifique In: Notae Prehistoricae 25–2005, pp. 25–38 PDF
 Semal, P. (2006): Neandertal devient numérique, In: Les Dossiers De La Recherche Nº 24, AOÛT 2006, pp. 18–19 PDF
 Veith, S. (2006): Unearthing the Neandertal, digitally In: Biophotonics International Vol.13, pp. 84–85
 Weniger, G.-C. et al. (2005) NESPOS. A new scientific online platform . In: The World is in your eyes. Computer Applications in Archaeology 2005, Tomar. PDF

Web technology
Pleistocene
Wikis